is a village located in Fukushima Prefecture, Japan. ,  the village had an estimated population of 5,031 in 1696 households, and a population density of 270 persons per km².

Geography
Nakajima is located in the flatlands of south-central Fukushima prefecture. 
Rivers: Abukuma River

Neighboring municipalities
 Fukushima Prefecture
 Shirakawa
 Izumizaki
 Yabuki
Ishikawa

Demographics
Per Japanese census data, the population of Nakajima has remained relatively stable over the past 50 years.

Climate
Nakajima has a humid climate (Köppen climate classification Cfa).

History
The area of present-day Nakajima was part of ancient Mutsu Province. The area was mostly tenryō territory under the direct control of the Tokugawa shogunate during the Edo period, except for a portion which was an exclave of Takada Domain of Echigo Province. After the Meiji Restoration, it was organized as part of Nishishirakawa District in the Nakadōri region of Iwaki Province. The villages of Nametsu and Yoshikogawa. were established with the creation of the modern municipalities system on April 1, 1889. Nakajima Village was formed on January 1, 1955 through the merger of the two villages.

Economy
The economy of Nakajima is primarily agricultural.

Education
Nakajima has two public elementary schools and one public junior high school operated by the village government. The village does not have a high school.
 Nakajima Middle School

Transportation

Railway
 Nakajma does have any passenger railway service

Highway
Nakajima is not served by any national highway

References

External links

 

 
Villages in Fukushima Prefecture